Indian Institute of Technology Patna (abbreviated IIT Patna or IITP) is a public research university and technical institute located at Bihta near Patna, Bihar. It is recognized as an Institute of National Importance by the Government of India. It is one of the new IITs established by an Act of the Indian Parliament on August 6, 2008.

The permanent campus of IIT Patna is located at Bihta which is approximately 30 km west of Patna and has been fully operational since 2015.

Campus

IIT Patna's campus is located at Amhara, Bihta, 35 km from Patna at a  site. The foundation stone of the IIT Patna, Bihta Campus was laid by Kapil Sibal in 2011. IIT Patna started its new session (from July 2015) in its permanent campus located at Bihta. The campus at Bihta was inaugurated by Prime Minister Narendra Modi on 25 July 2015. Earlier, the institute was operating from a temporary  complex in Pataliputra colony, Patna, in buildings which have been renovated and were previously used by the Naveen Government Polytechnic.

Administrative Building

This is the main building of the campus that can be viewed directly from the campus main gate. It houses all the administrative offices, the Central Library, the Directorate, offices of all the Deans and other officials.

Computer Science,Mechanical Engineering, Electrical Engineering Block (Block 3)
The Department of Computer Science is evolving since the inception of IIT Patna in the year 2008 and employs researchers like Prof. Pushpak Bhattacharyya, Dr. Jimson Mathew, Dr. Arijit Mondal, and others. Other Departments like Electrical Engineering and Mechanical Engineering also reside within the aegis of the department. The major research areas of the department include Communications, Signal Processing, VLSI, Electric Drives, Power Systems and Power Electronics. The department has online access to IEL, Science Direct, Springer and other online journals. Software like MATLAB and GAMS are available with the department in order to accelerate the research. Instructional laboratories for Basic Electronics, Analog Electronics Digital Electronics, Digital Signal Processing, Embedded Systems, VLSI, Electrical Machines, Power Electronics and Power Systems are fully operational.

Tutorial Block (Block 9)
All the academic lectures take place in the Tutorial Block. The five-storey building also temporarily houses the laboratories in Computer Science, Physics and Chemistry for the undergraduate students. It also has the Computer Centre of the institute with total 18 GBPS internet connections and adequate server infrastructure. Laboratories in Basic Electronics, Analog Electronics, Digital Electronics, VLSI, Control, Instrumentation and Communication are also located in this building.

Chemical and Biochemical Engineering Block

The Department of Chemical and Biochemical Engineering is a newly established department, that was instituted in 2015 with the efforts of Dr. Sujoy Kumar Samanta, faculty of IIT Patna. It is located in the Block-6 of the campus. The department accepted the first batch of undergraduate students in 2016 and presently has 9 faculty members. The Block-6 houses state-of-the-art research facilities for its young and dynamic faculty members in various research fields ranging from Clean fuel production,  capture and storage, Pinch analysis, Microwave-assisted heating, Process modelling and simulation to Bio-resource engineering and Wastewater treatment. The department has also set up various laboratories for its undergraduate students including Heat transfer laboratory, Mechanical Operations laboratory, Chemical Reaction Engineering laboratory, Process simulation laboratory among many others.

Science Block
The science block has classrooms, faculty rooms and laboratories for Physics, Chemistry and Mathematics. These include the material science research and optics research facilities of the Physics Department, the chemistry instruments and chemistry research facilities of the Chemistry Department and the computational research facility of the Mathematics Department.

Humanities and Social Sciences Block

The Department of Humanities and Social Sciences is located in Block 6.

The department has also set up a Centre for Endangered Language Studies to work for the minor/ tribal/endangered languages of the state of Bihar and adjoining areas. In addition, the centre aims to collaborate with the institutes and universities of the neighbouring states to work for minor/ tribal/endangered languages along the state borders.

Mechanical Engineering Block

The Mechanical Engineering Workshop building houses all the Mechanical Engineering Laboratories, viz. Basic and Conventional Manufacturing Lab, Advanced Manufacturing Lab, CAD/CAM Lab, Dynamics Lab, Fluid Mechanics Lab, Heat and Mass Transfer Lab, Instruments and Control Lab, IC Engines Lab, Material Testing Lab, Metrology and Metallographic Lab, Robotics Lab and Polymer Engineering Lab.

Organisation and administration

Governance

All IITs follow the same organization structure which has President of India as visitor at the top of the hierarchy. Directly under the president is the IIT Council. Under the IIT Council is the board of governors of each IIT.
Under the board of governors is the director, who is the chief academic and executive officer of the IIT. Under the director, in the organizational structure, comes the deputy director. Under the director and the deputy director, come the deans, heads of departments, registrar.

Schools And Centres

The institute has the following Schools, which conduct research as well as provide education.

School Of Engineering And Technology 
 Chemical and Biochemical Engineering
 Civil and Environmental Engineering
 Computer Science and Engineering
 Electrical Engineering
 Mechanical Engineering
 Metallurgical and Materials Engineering

School Of Humanities And Social Sciences 
 Humanities and Social Sciences
 Centre for Endangered Language Studies

School Of Basic Sciences 
 Chemistry
 Physics
 Mathematics

Academics

Undergraduate programs
IIT Patna awards Bachelor's degrees in the following disciplines:

 Bachelor of Technology in Computer Science and Engineering
 Bachelor of Technology in Artificial Intelligence and Data Science
 Bachelor of Technology in Electrical Engineering
 Bachelor of Technology in Mechanical Engineering
 Bachelor of Technology in Civil and Environmental Engineering
 Bachelor of Technology in Chemical Engineering
 Bachelor of Technology in Metallurgical and Materials Engineering
 Bachelor of Technology in Engineering Physics
 Bachelor of Science in Mathematics and Computing

Admission to these programs for 582 seats is through the Joint Entrance Examination (JEE)-Advanced, taken by students seeking admission into the IITs after completing 10+2 years of schooling. The Curriculum consists of eight semesters spread over four academic years. A student takes five to six theory courses in addition to laboratory courses in each semester. A student's performance is evaluated based on a credit system. Credits are allotted to each course depending on the number of lecture/tutorial/laboratory hours per week.

Postgraduate Programs
IIT Patna postgraduate programs include:	
 Master of Technology	
 Ph.D.

The M.tech program, started in 2012, awards degrees in following disciplines:

Master of Technology in Mathematics and Computing
Master of Technology in Nanotechnology
Master of Technology in Mechatronics
Master of Technology in Computer Science and Engineering
Master of technology in Communication Systems Engineering
Master of technology in Metallurgical and Materials Engineering
Master of Technology in Civil and Infrastructure Engineering
Master of Technology in VLSI and Embedded Systems
Master of Technology in Mechanical engineering

IIT Patna is the first IIT in the whole IIT system to start a M.tech program in Nanotechnology. Admission to M.tech is through GATE after which an interview is held to screen the shortlisted candidates. Sponsored Candidates are not required to appear in GATE and are directly called for interview on applying for admission to M.Tech. Program (if selected).
 	
Started in 2009, Phd degrees are awarded by all the departments. Requirements for admission into the Ph.D. programs include a master's degree and prior academic achievement. Students undergo an interview before gaining admission.

Rankings

Internationally, IIT Patna was ranked 351–400 in Asia in the QS World University Rankings of 2023. It was ranked 801–1000 in the world by the Times Higher Education World University Rankings of 2023, 251–300 in Asia in 2022 and in the same band among emerging economies.

IIT Patna was ranked 21 among Engineering Colleges in India by the National Institutional Ranking Framework (NIRF) in 2021 and 54 overall.

Incubation Centre IIT Patna
The Incubation Centre is supported by the Government of Bihar and the Department of Electronics and Information Technology (DeitY), Ministry of Communications and IT, Government of India.

The Incubation Centre accepts applications for incubation multiple times a year. The applicants submit a 10-page business plan which is evaluated by the Project Evaluation Team, composed of eminent personalities from Industry, academia, government and investment community. Shortlisted applicants are called for a presentation before an expert panel. Based on the recommendation from the panel, the applicant are then offered admission to the incubation programme. The selected start-ups are fully supported and provided with all facilities including fully furnished office spaces, communication facilities, state of the art ESDM laboratory facilities, guidance by mentors from Angel Investors, Industry, IITP faculty, Investor Connect, Training and Development programmes, and other assistance required.

The groundbreaking ceremony for the permanent building facility of the Incubation Centre at the IIT Patna's Bihta campus was held on 24 November 2018. The Chief Guest for the ceremony was the Deputy Chief Minister of Bihar, Shri Sushil Kumar Modi.

Collaboration with foreign universities
The International Relations Cell at IIT Patna is responsible for the entire institute's international activity. The IR Affairs office is committed to increasing international collaboration through exchange visits, and opening up international conversations by encouraging universities stakeholders to set up joint programs, joint research and projects, faculty exchange and internships for international students.

IIT Patna has collaborated with many foreign universities like National University of Singapore (NUS), University of Houston, Texas (USA), Louisiana State University (USA), University of Hartford, Connecticut (USA), University of Missouri, Columbia (USA), University of New South Wales (Australia), University of North Texas, Denton (USA) and University of Saskatchewan (Canada).

The MoU is intended to give opportunities to B.Tech., M.Tech. and Ph.D. students and faculty from IIT Patna to go to United States, Australia, Singapore and Canada and develop their research skills and interact with people working in different areas of science and technology.

Convocation
 The convocation for the first batch of IIT Patna was held on 23 December 2012 when Dr APJ Abdul Kalam awarded the degrees.
 The second convocation was held on 26 October 2013 when President Pranab Mukherjee awarded the degrees.
 For the first time, the third convocation of IIT Patna was held at the permanent campus in Bihta on 6 August 2015. 325-odd BTech, MTech and PhD students received degrees. Boeing India president Pratyush Kumar was the chief guest on the occasion.
 The most recent convocation ceremony took place on September 13, 2018, at the Gyan Bhawan, Samrat Ashok International Convention Center, Gandhi Maidan, Patna. Padma Shri awardee and scientist Shri Manas Bihari Verma was the chief guest for the occasion. IIT-Kanpur’s deputy director Minanidra Agarwal and IIT-P's Board of Governors Chairman Ajai Chowdhry were the guests of honour at the event. The institute also organized an alumni meet for its former students at its Bihta campus on the next day.

Research
The institute has set up many laboratories to conduct research in various disciplines of engineering, pure and applied sciences and humanities on campus. Research is carried out by faculty members and research scholars under the guidance of faculty members. Research work is also done at the undergraduate level usually in the fourth year of engineering 
The Sponsored Research and Industrial Relations Unit (SRIRU) was established in the year 2009 to promote interactive engagement between faculty and sponsoring agencies. The institute has received grants from various sponsoring agencies like Department of Information Technology - Govt. Of India, Department of Biotechnology - Govt. Of India, Defence Research and Development Organisation, Atomic Energy Regulatory Board, Department Of Science And Technology - Govt. Of India, CSIR, Department of Rural Development - Govt. Of India, UNICEF.

Student life and culture

Facilities

Hostels
The male students of IIT Patna are accommodated in three hostels which are located inside the campus. For accommodation of female students a separate hostel is available.

Medical Services
The college has a hospital inside the campus.

Sports
Sports facilities like cricket, football grounds are there. Basketball, Volleyball, Tennis and Badminton courts are also available near the hostel and various clubs are formed by students for managing and improving the level of sports in the campus. And facilities for indoor games like Table tennis, Carrom etc. are also available. The college itself has an inter-college sports tournament INFINITO. Also the students participate in Inter IIT Sports Meet each year.

Banks And Post Office
The branches of State Bank of India and Canara Bank are present inside the campus for providing banking facilities inside the campus. An India Post branch is also present in the campus for providing mailing facilities inside the campus. Amazon, Flipkart and other services visit the campus daily for other delivery needs.

Food
Various canteens and food outlets are available in and around the campus. The campus also has an authorized Amul Parlor outlet. There are various restaurants in Bihta which are usually visited by the campus community. The campus also has night canteens open up to 4 AM into the night.

Library
The Central Library of IIT Patna is one of the libraries in terms of its collection and services. Central Library caters to the information need of its highly demanding faculty members, students, research scholars as well as the staff of the institute, by offering a wide range of Information Technology (IT) based (and value-added) services and products.

Societies

The Student Activity Center operates with the following societies:
 IEEE Student Branch IIT-Patna
 Science and Technology Council
 NJACK (Computer Science Club)
 Sparkonics (Electrical Engineering Club)
 SCME (Mechanical Engineering Society)
 Robotics Club
 IITP Motorsports
 ACE (Civil Engineering Society)
 CHESSx (Chemical Engineering Society)
 MatES (Materials Engineering Society)
 House Of Socio-Cultural Affairs
 Pixxel, Photography Club
 Music Club
 Dance Club
 Yavanika, Dramatics Society
 Quiz Club
 House of Oratory Talents (Speaking Arts)
 House Of Literature And Fine Arts
 Sports clubs (of respective sports activities)
 Bhaktivedanta Club
 Entrepreneurship Club
 Rural Technology Development Club (RTDC)
 National Service Scheme (NSS), IIT Patna
 National Sports Organisation (India), IIT Patna

Festivals

Anwesha, the annual techno-cultural fest of Indian Institute of Technology, Patna is held in the month of January–February every year.

Student Activity Center
The Student Activity Center is the nucleus of all student curricular and extracurricular activities. Faculties have been appointed to supervise the work and events conducted by each society.

Workshops and Seminars
Workshops based on Robotics and other fields of sciences have been conducted.

Placements at IIT Patna
Training and Placement Cell actively engages in developing relationship with various industrial organizations and employers. The cell organises summer internships for pre-final year students and placement activities for final years students.
The recent placement statistics for IIT Patna can be seen here.

See also

Indian Institutes of Technology
Ministry of Human Resource Development (India)

References

External links

 

Engineering colleges in Bihar
Universities and colleges in Patna
Patna
Educational institutions established in 2008
2008 establishments in Bihar
Buildings and structures in Patna